Regis-Breitingen is a town in the Leipzig district, in Saxony, Germany. It is situated on the river Pleiße, 6 km southwest of Borna.

References 

Leipzig (district)